Buckmeadow Plantation House was a historic plantation house located along LA 2, about  northwest of Lake Providence, Louisiana.  It was built in 1840 and added to the National Register of Historic Places on September 15, 1983.

It was a "large, rambling, brick and frame, Carolina I house which was built in three stages between about 1840 and 1930."  It was built in about 1840 with two rooms on each floor and a one-story front gallery around sides and front.  When listed the house retained wooden Greek Revival mantels and square brick gallery posts from this era.  It was expanded by addition of a second frame I-house and otherwise modified in the late 1800s.  It was renovated again in the 1930s.

The house was removed from the National Register on December 28, 2015, after the land owner demolished the whole area, over the summer of 2015.

See also
National Register of Historic Places listings in East Carroll Parish, Louisiana

References

Houses on the National Register of Historic Places in Louisiana
Houses completed in 1840
Houses in East Carroll Parish, Louisiana
Former National Register of Historic Places in Louisiana
National Register of Historic Places in East Carroll Parish, Louisiana